The Beatific Visions is the second album by Brakes. It was released in November 2006. The Rough Trade Shop named it the fifth best album of the year.

Track listing
"Hold Me in the River" – 2:00
"Margarita" – 2:06
"If I Should Die Tonight" – 2:01
"Mobile Communication" – 3:47
"Spring Chicken" – 2:00
"Isabel" – 2:26
"Beatific Visions" – 2:53
"Porcupine or Pineapple" – 1:04
"Cease and Desist" – 2:27
"On Your Side" – 2:20
"No Return" – 4:57

References

2006 albums
Brakes (band) albums
Rough Trade Records albums